Cimiez (Italian: Cimella) is an upper class neighborhood in Nice, Southern France. The area contains the Musée Matisse and the ruins of Cemenelum, capital of the Ancient Roman province Alpes Maritimae on the Ligurian coast. Cemenelum was an important rival of Nice, continuing to exist as a separate city till the time of the Lombard invasions. The ruins include an arena, amphitheater, thermal baths, and paleochristian basilica. 

During the Belle Epoque, Cimiez became a favourite holiday resort of European royalty: Victoria, Edward VII, George V, and Leopold II  stayed in Cimiez.  

Close to the ruins is the Excelsior Régina Palace where Queen Victoria spent part of her long visits to the French Riviera.

From 1974 to 2010, the Nice Jazz Festival was held on the grounds of the Roman Ruins in July each year (since 2011 the festival moved to the Place Masséna).

Also here can be found the Cimiez Monastery and church that have been used by the Franciscan friars since the 16th century. The church with a baroque altar from the seventeenth century and a marble cross from 1477 houses the paintings  Pietà (triptych from 1475), Crucifixion (1512) and  Deposition (1515) by the Italian medieval artist Ludovico Brea. On display are also more than 300 documents and works of art from the 15th to 18th centuries. Buried in the cemetery near the monastery are the painters Henri Matisse and Raoul Dufy, alongside the winner of the 1937 Nobel Prize for Literature, Roger Martin du Gard.

Cimiez contains an important Jewish population (around 20%).

See also
 Bishopric of Cimiez

References

External links

 Matisse Museum
 Nice jazz festival
 Cimiez was also the place of famous feasts: “of the small gourds”...

Nice
Henri Matisse